Nizar Aghri (born 1961) is a Syrian-Kurdish writer and translator. He was born in Turkey and currently lives in Oslo. 

He has published three novels: 
 The Papers of Mullah Za’afran (2005), 
 Salem Street (2017) and 
 In Search of Azar (2021). 

In Search of Azar was nominated for the Arabic Booker Prize in 2022. He has also translated several books by the Italian writer Erri De Luca.

References

Syrian writers
1961 births
Living people
Date of birth missing (living people)